Sudanese protests may refer to:

 2011–2013 Sudanese protests
 2018–19 Sudanese protests
 2019–2022 Sudanese protests